The Car Tour is the seventh headlining concert tour by English indie rock band Arctic Monkeys, launched in support of their sixth studio album, The Car (2022). The tour began on 9 August 2022 in Istanbul at Zorlu PSM, and will conclude on 1 October 2023 in Los Angeles at Kia Forum, visiting North America, South America, Oceania and Eurasia. This marks their first tour since Tranquility Base Hotel & Casino Tour (2018–2019), and features the band, alongside usual touring members, Scott Gillies, Tom Rowley, Davey Latter, and Tyler Parkford.

Background
In November 2021, the band announced a tour of Europe which began in August,
In April and June they extended the tour into November 2022, with dates added in the United States and England, as well as Latin America. On 9 August, the band played live in Istanbul. This was the tour's opening performance, and the Arctic Monkeys' first performance since 2019. No new songs were debuted until their performance at Zürich OpenAir Festival on 23 August, where they played "I Ain't Quite Where I Think I Am". Other tracks debuted during their first leg of tour include "Mr. Schwartz", "Big Ideas" and "The Car", alongside singles, "There'd Better Be A Mirrorball" and "Body Paint". In June 2022 the band announced shows in Australia, with support from Australian bands, Mildlife, DMA's and The Buoys.

Their stadium tour was announced in September 2022, with dates in the UK, Ireland, North America, and Central Europe, finalizing in September 2023. Further European dates were added on December. The bands first ever tour of Asia was announced a few days later. The band also headlined several music festivals, including Sziget Festival, Lowlands, Pukkelpop, Rock en Seine, Reading and Leeds, Corona Capital, Rock Werchter, Bilbao BBK Live, NOS Alive, and different iterations of Primavera Sound and Falls Festival. For the tour, the group are joined by longtime touring members Tom Rowley, Davey Latter, and Tyler Parkford.

Opening acts

Inhaler was the first band announced as an opening act on the tour. They played both nights in Istanbul, and then shows at Burgas, Pula, and Prague in August 2022, while returning for select dates during the following spring leg of Europe. Inhaler found out they were supporting the band the same month it was announced. Of the opportunity, drummer Ryan McMahon said, "Every night, we just got to watch them be the greatest rock band in the world, they’re just so on it, and for a band that hadn’t toured in like three years, they really proved why they’re still at the top, and their new album is so fun to listen to. The fact we get to do it all again goes back to that imposter syndrome. We don’t feel worthy of it at all."

Interpol joined the band for three shows in South America, while Father John Misty, opened for them in Colombia. For their shows in Oceania they chose Australian bands Mildlife, in Melbourne and Brisbane, while, DMA's and The Buoys will be joining them in Sydney. The Hives and The Mysterines will be supporting during all their dates in England, with the former returning for select dates in the rest of the European Leg. The Hives had previously supported Arctic Monkeys for select dates in 2014 and 2019. Willie J Healey will also appear in select dates for this leg. Fontaines D.C. will serve as the opening act for the whole North American leg in 2023. Guitarist Carlos O'Connell told NME, "Arctic Monkeys are just so iconic obviously – they were so important when they came through, And I remember when we first heard Alex Turner was into the band, that felt like just insane." Also adding, "When we were younger these were things you’d never imagine".

Critical reception
NME 's Thomas Smith reviewed the band's set at Reading positively, saying, "This ain’t quite Nirvana in 1992, but still cements itself as one of the festival’s biggest and busiest sets in recent memory – a reminder of the band’s cross-generational reach." Smith praised the band's hability to blend their most commercial songs with the deep cuts, but noted a lack of crowd interaction. The show only featured two songs from Tranquility Base Hotel & Casino, which Smith described as "a masterpiece that doesn’t always translate at festival headline sets." Regardless, he thought the band "still happen to be the best in the game." Nacho Sánchez of El País thought their set at Cala Mijas was "solid" and noted the band's preference for AM on their setlist, Sánchez was also mindful of their mix of "teenage rock" and the slower 70's-infused sound of their latest albums. He though the maturity "looked great on the band", and that the crowd was very much enjoying the show. While reviewing one of their nights at Sidney Myer Music Bowl, Sian Cain of The Guardian said, "There are few frontmen touring today who lean into the theatrics of rockstardom as effortlessly as Alex Turner". She thought that songs from The Car seemed out of place with the rest of their setlist, adding, "they sound less like Arctic Monkeys, more like Alex Turner featuring Arctic Monkeys", she also lamented the decision to play the album without strings on stage, which she felt "strips back some of its seductive opulence". Cain was more forgiving of the overall performance, describing the band and its touring members as "polished", noting "when every note sounds so spot on, who truly cares?" and thought towards the end, Turner's warmth shone, as he reveled in the applause and blew kisses to the crowd.

Recording
The group released the concert film Arctic Monkeys at Kings Theatre on their YouTube channel in October 2022. The film was directed by Chappell and Zackery Michael, and features selected footage of the band, both backstage and performing, at their show on Brooklyn's Kings Theatre.

Songs performed

Whatever People Say I Am, That's What I'm Not
 "The View from the Afternoon"
 "I Bet You Look Good on the Dancefloor"
 "From the Ritz to the Rubble"

Favourite Worst Nightmare
 "Brianstorm"
 "Teddy Picker"
 "Do Me a Favour"
 "505"

Humbug
 "Crying Lightning"
 "Potion Approaching"
 "Cornerstone"
 "Pretty Visitors"

Suck It and See
 "Don't Sit Down 'Cause I've Moved Your Chair"
 "Library Pictures"
 "That's Were You're Wrong"

AM
 "Do I Wanna Know?"
 "R U Mine?"
 "One for the Road"
 "Arabella"
 "No.1 Party Anthem"
 "Fireside"
 "Why'd You Only Call Me When You're High?"
 "Snap Out of It"
 "Knee Socks"
 "I Wanna Be Yours"

Tranquility Base Hotel & Casino
 "One Point Perspective"
 "Tranquility Base Hotel & Casino"
 "Four Out of Five"
 "The Ultracheese"

The Car
 "There'd Better Be a Mirrorball"
 "I Ain't Quite Where I Think I Am"
 "Sculptures of Anything Goes"
 "Body Paint"
 "The Car"
 "Big Ideas"
 "Mr Schwartz"

Set list
Average set-list for the tour according to setlist.fm

"Do I Wanna Know?"
"Brianstorm"
"Snap Out Of It"
"Four Out of Five"
"Crying Lightning"
"Don't Sit Down 'Cause I've Moved Your Chair"
"Why'd You Only Call Me When You're High?"
"Potion Approaching"
"Teddy Picker"
"The View from the Afternoon"
"Tranquility Base Hotel & Casino"
"Arabella"
"Cornerstone"
"Pretty Visitors"
"One Point Perspective"
"Body Paint"
"Do Me A Favour"
"Knee Socks"
"505"

Encore
"There'd Better Be a Mirrorball"
"I Bet You Look Good on the Dancefloor"
"R U Mine?"

Tour dates

Personnel

Arctic Monkeys
 Alex Turner – lead vocals, electric guitar, acoustic guitar, piano
 Jamie Cook – electric guitar, acoustic guitar, organ
 Nick O'Malley – bass guitar, backing vocals
 Matt Helders – drums, percussion, backing vocals

Touring members
 Scott Gillies – electric guitar
 Tom Rowley – electric guitar, baritone guitar, lap steel guitar, keyboards, backing vocals
 Davey Latter – percussion
 Tyler Parkford – keyboards, backing vocals

Notes

References

2023 concert tours
2022 concert tours
Arctic Monkeys